The seventh season of JAG premiered on CBS on September 25, 2001, and concluded on May 21, 2002. The season, starring David James Elliott and Catherine Bell, was produced by Belisarius Productions in association with Paramount Television.

Plot 
Commander Harmon "Harm" Rabb, Jr. (David James Elliott), a former Naval aviator turned lawyer, is assigned to the Headquarters of the Navy Judge Advocate General alongside fellow Marine Corps lawyer Lieutenant Colonel Sarah "Mac" MacKenzie (Catherine Bell), a squared away officer with a dysfunctional past. This season, Mac waits anxiously for news of Harm, who has been lost at sea ("Adrift"), before requesting an assignment away from JAG ("New Gun in Town"), while Commander Sturgis Turner (Scott Lawrence) joins the team. Also, Harm defends a Major accused of homicide ("Measure of Men") and a Marine is accused of rape ("Guilt"), Mac is awarded the Meritorious Service Medal ("Mixed Messages"), Harm faces disbarment ("Redemption"), and six Marines are killed in an ambush ("Ambush"). Later, the team run a marathon ("Jagathon"), The CAG (Terry O'Quinn) comes out of retirement ("Dog Robber"), and Jennifer Coates (Zoe McLellan) is assigned Harm as legal counsel ("Answered Prayers"), before Harm and Mac go up against Admiral Chegwidden (John M. Jackson) at a military tribunal when prosecuting a top Al-Qaeda terrorist, and Lieutenant Bud Roberts (Patrick Labyorteaux) is injured on a land mine in Afghanistan ("Enemy Below").

Production 
During its seventh season, JAG began to show "a surprising resurgence", with the season premiere achieving "the second-highest ratings in [the series'] seven-year history". Series creator Donald P. Bellisario "credits the national wave of patriotism for part of the show’s new strength. "People are tuning in to get some insight into what the military is all about," he says. "We show the positive and the negative, but we also give respect to those officers who lay it on the line." Lead actor David James Elliott, who portrays hunky lawyer Commander Harmon Rabb in the Navy's Judge Advocate General's office, agrees: "In the past, people thought the show was all about the military and just decided that they didn’t like it," says Elliott. "The fact that we’re feeling more favorably about our military can only help."

Cast and characters

Main

Also starring

Recurring

Guest appearances

Episodes

See also 
 2001–02 United States network television schedule

Notes

References 

07
2001 American television seasons
2002 American television seasons